Christon Baptiste (born 25 January 1980) is a retired Trinidadian football player.

Career statistics

International

International goals
Scores and results list Trinidad and Tobago's goal tally first.

References

External links
 

1980 births
Living people
Trinidad and Tobago footballers
Trinidad and Tobago international footballers
Association football midfielders
2007 CONCACAF Gold Cup players
Defence Force F.C. players